Kang Moon-kweon (born 24 April 1988, Seoul) is a South Korean field hockey player who competed in the 2008 and 2012 Summer Olympics. His twin brother, Kang Moon-kyu, is also an Olympic field hockey player.

References

External links

1988 births
Living people
South Korean male field hockey players
Olympic field hockey players of South Korea
Field hockey players at the 2008 Summer Olympics
Field hockey players at the 2012 Summer Olympics
Asian Games medalists in field hockey
Field hockey players at the 2014 Asian Games
People from Seoul
South Korean twins
Asian Games bronze medalists for South Korea
Medalists at the 2014 Asian Games
2010 Men's Hockey World Cup players
2014 Men's Hockey World Cup players
20th-century South Korean people
21st-century South Korean people